VakıfBank is the second largest bank in Turkey in terms of asset size, established with an initial capital of TL 50 million on January 11, 1954 and later started operating on April 13, 1954. Abdi Serdar Üstünsalih has been selected as the CEO of the Bank. 

VakıfBank has 935 branches, 4,153 ATMs and 963,062  units of POS that constitute its distribution channels as of September 30, 2022. VakıfBank has four international branches located in New York, Bahrain, Arbil and Qatar. In addition, VakıfBank operates in Austria with a subsidiary, VakıfBank International AG, which has branches in Vienna and Cologne.

Vakıfbank offers commercial loan supports as well as retail loans such as consumer loans, auto loans and housing loans.

Present 
The Bank is a full service commercial and retail bank with its headquarters in İstanbul, Turkey and is controlled by the Turkish Treasury, which (pursuant to Decree No. 696) on 11 December 2019 acquired shares in the Bank that had previously been held by various foundations managed by the GDF and (indirectly through the Turkey Wealth Fund) acquired newly issued shares of the Bank on 20 May 2020 and 21 March 2022. As of 30 September 2022, the Bank was the second largest Turkish bank in terms of assets, second in terms of loans 
 and deposits  and fourth in terms of branch network  according to the BRSA and the Banks Association of Turkey. As of such date, the Bank provided retail, commercial and investment banking services through a network of 935 full service branches. Internationally, the Bank has a subsidiary in each of Austria and the Turkish Republic of Northern Cyprus and a branch in each of New York City, Bahrain and in Erbil in the Republic of Iraq. In February 2019, the Bank obtained the approval of the BRSA to open representative offices in PRC and Qatar with the purpose of enhancing its international operations.  On February 2, 2021 VakıfBank Qatar Branch was approved to commence the regulated activities by Qatar Financial Centre Regulatory Authority.

in Brief
VakıfBank is one of the "multi-specialist" banks in Turkey. The modern banking products and services that it offers cover not only corporate, commercial and small-scale enterprise banking, but also the retail and private banking sectors. Being engaged in investment banking and capital market activities in addition to the basic banking products and services, VakıfBank offers the full range of financial products required in this era via state of the art technology including, but not limited to underwriting, financial leasing and factoring services, etc. by means of its financial participations.

In addition, the Bank offers its services through alternative distribution channels such as ATMs, a call centre and internet banking. VakıfBank has been reaching out its corporate and individual customers through alternative distribution channels such as ATMs, a call centre and internet banking as well as 935 branches spread throughout the country and undertaking a leading role in the financing of domestic and foreign trade. VakıfBank has four international offices located in New York and Bahrain, Arbil and Qatar. In addition, VakıfBank operates in Austria with a subsidiary, VakıfBank International AG, which has branches in Vienna and Cologne.

Vakıf Yatırım, a subsidiary of Vakıfbank, provides support to stock market investors.

Ownership Structure
Following the public offering in 2005, 74.76% share of the General Directorate of Foundations in the Bank decreased to 58.45% and 24.89% share of the VakıfBank Pension Fund decreased to 16.10% and the publicly traded shares constituted 25.18% of the Bank’s capital.

As of December 11, 2019, 43.00% shares and 15.51% shares of General Directorate of Foundations representing Group (A) and Group (B), respectively (58.51% in total) have been transferred to the Ministry of Treasury and Finance as per the Presidential Decree dated December 3, 2019.

As of May 20, 2020, the capital increase process of VakıfBank was completed through private placement and Türkiye Wealth Fund became a shareholder of the Bank with 35.99% share.

As of March 21, 2022, the capital increase process of VakıfBank was completed through private placement and Türkiye Wealth Fund increased its shareholder of the Bank with 64.85% share. Please click here to see current ownership structure.

Management
VakıfBank is managed by its board of directors and its general manager. The articles of association of VakıfBank provide for the Board to have nine members appointed for a term of three years, which appointments can be continued for multiple terms. Following the amendments made by Decree No. 696 to the Vakıfbank Law’s article regarding the formation of the Board, each of the Board members of the Bank is appointed by the General Assembly. Pursuant to the articles, three members of the Board are selected among candidates proposed by holders of a majority of the Bank’s Class A shares (one of which Board members is required to be independent), one member of the Board is selected among candidates proposed by holders of a majority of the Bank’s Class B shares, two members of the Board are selected among candidates proposed by holders of a majority of the Bank’s Class C shares (one of which Board members is required to be independent), one member of the Board is selected by the shareholders by taking into account the preferences of the holders of the Bank’s Class D shares (which Board member is required to be independent) and two remaining members of the Board are selected by the General Assembly among the candidates proposed by the shareholders.

VakıfBank's Board of Directors took the following decisions unanimously on March 25th, 2022 regarding the distribution of duties among Board Members as per the Articles of Incorporation. Mr. Mustafa Saydam was selected as the Chairperson. Mr. Cemil Ragıp Ertem was selected as the Deputy Chairperson. Mr. Abdi Serdar Üstünsalih was selected as the CEO.

Subsidiaries and Affiliates 
VakıfBank has 11 subsidiaries which are Vakıf Faktoring A.Ş., Vakıf Finansal Kiralama A.Ş., Vakıf Gayrimenkul Yatırım Ortaklığı A.Ş., Vakıf Menkul Kıymet Yat. Ort. A.Ş., Vakıf Yatırım Menkul Değerler A.Ş., Vakıf Pazarlama San. ve Ticaret A.Ş., Taksim Otelcilik A.Ş., Vakıf Enerji ve Madencilik A.Ş., Vakıf Gayrimenkul Değerleme A.Ş., VakıfBank International AG. ANF Vakıf Elektronik Para ve Dağıtım Hizmetleri A.Ş. also VakıfBank has 14 affiliates operating in various sectors.

See also
 List of banks in Turkey

References

Banks of Turkey
Companies listed on the Istanbul Stock Exchange
Banks established in 1954
Companies based in Istanbul
Turkish brands
Turkish companies established in 1954